Zacarías Ortiz Rolón (6 September 1934 – 6 January 2020) was a Paraguayan Roman Catholic bishop.

Ortiz Rolón was born in Paraguay and was ordained to the priesthood in 1965. He served as bishop of the Apostolic Vicariate of Chaco Paraguayo, Paraguay, from 1988 to 2003 and as bishop of the Roman Catholic Diocese of Concepción en Paraguay, Paraguay, from 2003 to 2013.

Notes

1934 births
2020 deaths
21st-century Roman Catholic bishops in Paraguay
20th-century Roman Catholic bishops in Paraguay
Roman Catholic bishops of Concepción en Paraguay